Tomas Abyu (born 5 May 1978) is an Ethiopian-born British long-distance runner.

Abyu grew up in the Arsi region of Ethiopia, as a junior he trained with Gezahegne Abera. Abyu left Ethiopia where his father had been killed in the civil war. He came to the United Kingdom as a political refugee and was given asylum in 2000, becoming a British citizen in 2005.

Abyu made his marathon debut in Manchester in October 2002, winning the event in 2:25:28.
He transferred allegiance in 2006 becoming eligible to represent Great Britain in athletics.

He improved to record a marathon personal best of 2:10:37, finishing second, at the Dublin Marathon in Oct 2007. The time was better than Beijing Olympic British team qualifying time (2:12), but the Dublin Marathon was not a recognized event, so Abyu needed to meet the qualifying time at the 2008 London Marathon. Unfortunately he finished in a time of 2:15:49, placed 16th and the second Britain behind Dan Robinson.

International competition

Other Races

References

External links

1978 births
Living people
Ethiopian male long-distance runners
British male long-distance runners
Ethiopian male marathon runners
British male marathon runners
Sportspeople from Oromia Region
Ethiopian emigrants to the United Kingdom
Naturalised citizens of the United Kingdom